Grevillea celata, commonly known as Nowa Nowa grevillea or Colquhoun grevillea, is a species of flowering plant in the family Proteaceae and is endemic to a restricted part of Victoria in Australia. It is an erect and open to low, dense shrub with oblong, broadly elliptic or linear leaves, and red and yellow, or red, white and apricot-coloured, sometimes all yellow flowers.

Description
The lower surface of the leaves is woolly-hairy.

Grevillea alpina and G. chrysophaea are similar species, but neither forms suckers.

Taxonomy
Grevillea celata was first formally described in 1995 by Bill Molyneux in the journal Muelleria from specimens he collected from Colquhoun State Forest in south-eastern Victoria in 1993. The specific epithet (celata) means "hidden" or "concealed within", referring to the earlier confusion with G. alpina and G. chrysophaea.

Distribution and habitat
Nowa Nowa grevillea grows in dry sclerophyll woodland in Colquhoun State Forest near Bruthen in south-eastern Victoria.

Conservation status
The species is listed as "vulnerable" under the Australian Government Environment Protection and Biodiversity Conservation Act, as "rare" under the Flora and Fauna Guarantee Act 1988 and as "vulnerable in Victoria" on the Department of Sustainability and Environment's Advisory List of Rare Or Threatened Plants In Victoria, and a National Recovery Plan has been prepared. The main threats to the species include inapprpriate fire regimes, road works, and browsing by kangaroos.

References

celata
Flora of Victoria (Australia)
Proteales of Australia
Plants described in 1995